Kevin Anderson was the defending champion, but chose to compete in Munich instead.Gastón Gaudio won in the final 7–5, 6–0, against Martín Vassallo Argüello.

Seeds

Draw

Finals

Top half

Bottom half

References
Main Draw
Qualifying Singles

Sanremo Tennis Cup - Singles
Sanremo Tennis Cup